Battle of Dholpur was fought between Kingdom of Mewar under Rana Sanga and Lodi dynasty under Ibrahim Lodi.
Rana Sanga defeated Ibrahim Lodi in Dholpur after defeating Lodi in battle of Khatoli.

Ibrahim Lodi was seething because of his defeat at the Battle of Khatoli at the hands of Rana Sanga. To avenge it, he made great preparations and moved against Rana Sanga. The Rajput armies were stretched because of conflicts with the Sultans of Malwa and Gujarat. Ibrahim Lodi was keen on taking advantage of this situation to crush the Rajputs. In hot action fought near Dholpur, the Rajputs, as in the earlier action, made a furious charge. "under its momentum, The Lodi army scattered like dead leaves caught in a gale". Ibrahim Lodi was once again humbled and Rana Sanga followed this victory by conquering most of present-day Rajasthan.

Battle
When Ibrahim Lodi's army reached Rana Sanga's territory, the Maharana quickly advanced with his Rajputs. As the two armies came in sight of each other near Dholpur, Mian Makhan made dispositions for the battle. Said Khan Furat and Haji Khan were placed on the right, Daulat Khan commanded the center, Allahdad Khan and Yusuf Khan were placed on the left. The army of Ibrahim Lodi was fully prepared to give the Maharana a warm reception.

The Rajputs started the battle with a cavalry charge which was personally led by Rana Sanga, his cavalry with their accustomed valor, advanced and fell on the army of Ibrahim Lodi, and in a short time put the enemy to flight. "Many brave and worthy men were made martyrs and the others were scattered". The Rajputs pushed the army of Ibrahim Lodi up to Bayana.

Hussain Khan taunted his fellow nobles from Delhi: "It is a hundred pities that 30,000 horsemen should have been defeated by so few Hindus."

Aftermath
By this victory, each part of Malwa which had been usurped by Muhammad Shah (Sahib Khan), younger brother of Sultan Mahmud Khilji II of Mandu, during his rebellion against his brother, and had subsequently been taken possession of by Sultan Sikander Lodi, father of Sultan Ibrahim Lodi, now fell into the hands of the Maharana of Mewar, Rana Sanga. Chanderi was one of the many places which fell into the hands of the Maharana, who then bestowed it on Medini Rai as a gift.

References

History of Rajasthan
Dholpur
Dholpur
Dholpur